The Camp de concentration d'Argelès-sur-Mer was an internment camp established in early February 1939 on the territory of the French commune of Argelès-sur-Mer for Spanish Republican refugees. Some of the refugees were retreating members of the Spanish Republican Army (Ejército Popular Republicano) in the Northeast of Spain in the last months of the Spanish Civil War.

Description

The camp was located near the Mediterranean coast at the foot of the northern side of the Albera Massif in Roussillon, 8 km north of the French-Spanish border.

The camp at Argelès received more than 100,000 Spanish men and women, of both civilian and military backgrounds. The latter were the remainder of the Eastern Region Army Group (GERO) that crossed the border following the Fall of Barcelona and the Retirada – the desperate withdrawal of long civilian and military columns towards the French border at the end of the Francoist Catalonia Offensive.
All refugees were disarmed and arrested upon entering France.

Republican military leaders such as Modesto, commander of the 4th Division and Líster, commander of the 11th Division of the elite V Army Corps, had first seen the retreat to France of the remainder of the Ebro Army as part of a tactical evacuation, with the aim of regrouping these units with the remaining units of the last area under Republican control in order to continue the resistance. 
The French government, however, would not allow the Republican units that crossed the border to be transferred to the remaining Spanish Republican territory. All the veteran survivors of the 11th Division, together with all Republican military, were disarmed and swiftly interned in French concentration camps immediately after crossing its border.

The conditions were very poor in this concentration camp, there were no latrines, running water, huts or any kind of shelter, apart from holes in the ground dug by inmates. Food was thrown over the wire into the compound by French officials and Republican doctors were not allowed supplies or equipment. Diseases were prevalent. The guards would bring around petroleum baths to combat the infestations of fleas and lice. Efforts to encourage the refugees to return to Spain were common. The concentration camps were very large and poorly run. People died of hypothermia, disease, or despair. It was common to see dead bodies piled up and left in the open in areas throughout the camp.

The French government went on to found internment camps all along the northern foot of the Pyrenees to relieve the grim conditions at Argelès. Many refugees ended up confined in those camps, e.g. Gurs internment camp.

Notable prisoners 
Marcel Langer, member of the international brigades, later in World War II a hero of the French Resistance in Toulouse, where he was guillotined on 23 July 1943
Diego Camacho (pen name Abel Paz), Spanish writer and novelist
Rubén Ruiz Ibárruri, son of Spanish Communist leader Dolores Ibárruri, La Pasionaria.
Vicente Ferrer Moncho.
Joaquim Amat-Piniella, Catalan writer.
Peko Dapčević, Yugoslav partisan.
 Arthur Adamov (23 August 1908 – 15 March 1970), playwright, one of the foremost exponents of the Theatre of the Absurd.
 Andrés García La Calle, Commander of the fighter units of the Spanish Republican Air Force
 Josep Bartolí, Catalan artist

Commemoration 

Inscription on the commemorative monument on the northern beach of Argelès-sur-Mer:

References

Further reading
 Espinar, Jaime (1940) "Argelés-sur-mer": Campo de Concentración para Españoles Editorial "Elite", Caracas, Venezuela, ; available on microfiche , in Spanish
 Ferrer Rodriguez, Eulalio (1987) Entre Alambradas: Diario de los campos de concentracion Pangea, Mexico City, in Spanish
 Garcia, John Andres (2008) "The International Brigades and the Refugee Camps of the south of France" Manning Clark House Inc., Forrest, Australia, 
 MacMaster, Neil and Granda, David (1990) Spanish Fighters: An oral history of civil war and exile St. Martin's Press, New York, 
 Stephen, Walter M. (2001) La Retirada: Sixty Years on at Argeles Hills of Home, Edinburgh, Scotland,

External links
 Argelès-sur-Mer Internment Camp Photographs Capa, Robert (1939) International Center of Photography. Retrieved 2010-09-23.

Concentration camps in France
Internment camps of the Spanish Civil War
World War II sites in France